Herman van Ham (16 April 1931 – 2 August 2012) was a Dutch head chef. He worked in the Michelin starred Hostellerie De Hamert, in Wellerlooi, the Netherlands, when it earned his stars in the period 1963-1989.

In 1952, Van Ham started working at De Hamert as an assistant. Soon after that he took over as head chef and stayed till his retirement in 1988.

Herman van Ham specialized in asparagus to such an extent that he had several nicknames related to this. He was named as De Ongekroonde Koning van de Asperge (Eng.:The uncrowned king of Asparagus), Asperge Paus (Eng.:Asparagus Pope) and Mister Asperge (Eng.: Mister Asparagus).
One of his famous asparagus dishes was the "Cocktail Prins Alexander", a combination of chicken, asparagus and oranges, created in 1967 in celebration of the birth of Willem-Alexander, Prince of Orange.

After his retirement, Van Ham started collecting asparagus dishes. His collection went on display in Keramiekcentrum Tiendschuur Tegelen in 2012 under the name "Het keramische bedje voor de asperge." (Eng.: The ceramic bed for the asparagus.) Earlier, in 2008, his collection was on display in Aspergemuseum De Locht

Herman van Ham died on 2 August 2012, after an illness.

Awards
 Michelin star 1963–1988
 Prix d'Escoffier de l'Alliance Gastronomique Néerlandaise/Alliance-Escoffier Prijs: 1988
 Chevalier de Confrérie de l'asperge de Limbourgondie
 Eremedaille in goud Oranje Nassau
 Chevalier de Chaîne des Rôtisseurs.

Books
 Het aspergesboek : heerlijke gerechten met de koningin der groenten; Wiel Basten and Herman van Ham, M & P, 1989
 Het aspergeboek; Herman van Ham and Wiel Basten, Van Dishoeck, 2005
 Het aspergekookboek; Herman van Ham and Wiel Basten, Van Reemst, 1998

References

1931 births
2012 deaths
Dutch chefs
Head chefs of Michelin starred restaurants
People from Skarsterlân